Power bar may refer to

 Power strip, an electronic device used to plug in other devices to power them
 Powerbar, a kind of energy bars made by an American company of the same name
 Power bar is an alternative name for a breaker bar
 Health meter, a video game mechanic